George Strait is the twentieth studio album by the American country music singer of the same name. The first album of his career not to achieve RIAA platinum certification, it produced three singles for him on the Billboard Hot Country Singles & Tracks (now Hot Country Songs) charts: "Go On" at #2, "Don't Make Me Come over There and Love You" at #17, and "If You Can Do Anything Else" at #5, making it the first album in his career since 1992's “Holding My Own” not to produce a number one hit.

"You're Stronger Than Me" was originally recorded by Patsy Cline in 1962.

Rodney Crowell later recorded "The Night's Just Right for Love" as "The Night's Just Right" on his 2008 album Sex & Gasoline.

Track listing

Personnel
As listed in liner notes.

Musicians
Eddie Bayers – drums
Stuart Duncan – fiddle, mandolin
Paul Franklin – steel guitar
Steve Gibson – acoustic guitar, electric guitar, mandolin
Wes Hightower – background vocals
Liana Manis – background vocals
Brent Mason – electric guitar, acoustic guitar, gut string guitar
Steve Nathan – keyboards
George Strait – lead vocals
Glenn Worf – bass guitar
The Nashville String Machine performs on "Looking Out My Window Through Pain" directed by Bergen White and "The Night's Just Right for Love" and "She Took the Wind from His Sails" directed by Ron Huff.

Production
Chuck Ainlay – engineering and mixing
Chad Brown – 2nd engineer
David Bryant – additional 2nd engineer (overdubs)
Eric Conn – digital editing
Justin Niebank – engineering (overdubs)
Jessie Noble – project coordinator
Mark Ralston – 2nd engineer
Leslie Richter – additional 2nd engineer (overdubs)
Greg Fogie – additional 2nd engineer
Tony Green – 2nd Engineer (Overdubs)

Design
Tom Bert – photography
Jerry Joyner – design
Chris Ferrara – design

Charts

Weekly charts

Year-end charts

References

Allmusic (see infobox)

2000 albums
George Strait albums
MCA Records albums
Albums produced by Tony Brown (record producer)